A sootblower is a device for removing the soot that is deposited on the internal furnace tubes of a boiler during combustion to prevent plugging of the gas passes and maintain boiler efficiency.

Types of soot blowers:
Wall Blowers also known as IRs (Insertable Rotating)
Long Retractable Sootblower (LRSB) or IK (Insertable Kinetic)
Part-Retractable Sootblowers
Oscillating Sootblowers
Rake Sootblowers
Air Heater Blower
Rotating Element Sootblowers
Multi-Media Sootblowers
Fixed Rotating

Steam blowing medium:
Steam 
Air
High Pressure Water
Dual-media air heater

Steam is normally used as a medium for blowing away the soot since capital cost of steam pressure reducing equipment and drain is less than the cost of compressors, motors and control of air systems.

Benefits of Sootblowers 
 Increased plant availability
 Improved boiler and fired heater efficiency
 Controlled deposit build-up 
 Reduced  emissions
 Steam savings
 Optimised combustion process
 Increased energy recovery effectiveness
 Flexible operation for changing fuel mixture and varying fuel quality

Problems caused by soot

Reduced efficiency
Soot deposited on the heating surfaces of a boiler acts as a heat insulator. The result is that less heat is transferred to the water to raise steam and more heat is wasted up the chimney. This leads to higher fuel consumption and/or poor steaming.

Soot fires
A soot fire can be damaging to a boiler because it can cause localized hotspots to occur in the tubes. These hotspots may reach temperatures that weaken the materials of the tubes. Sootblowers reduce the risk of soot fires and their resulting damage.

Operation
A sootblower may be operated manually or by a remotely controlled motor. The soot, which is removed from the heating surfaces, will be blown out with the flue gases. If the boiler is equipped with a dust collector, it will trap the soot.  Otherwise, the soot will be ejected into the outside air through the chimney stack.

Industries 

A sootblower can make an important contribution for an optimised, more efficient and low-emission operation supporting clean energy generation in many industries, including:

 Power Industry
 Petrochemical Industry
 Waste-to Energy Plants
 Biomass Plants
 Marine
 Other Industrial Processes

See also
Boiler Monitoring / Cameras -  Allows plant operators to accurately view and monitor internal furnace and process applications.

SMART Clean

External links
Marine Engineer World 
 Boiler Efficiency - Clyde Bergemann (cbpg.com)

Steam boiler components